AAA Invading LA is an upcoming professional wrestling pay-per-view (PPV) event that will be produced and scripted by the Mexican professional wrestling promotion Lucha Libre AAA Worldwide (AAA or Triple A). The event will take place at The Forum in Inglewood, California of the Los Angeles metropolitan area.

The event will air on PPV in the US via FITE TV.

Production

Background
In April 2019, it was announced that Lucha Libre AAA Worldwide would be running a show at Madison Square Garden. During the press conference for the MSG show, AAA speculated about future events in the United States. On June 19, it was announced that AAA would be holding a second U.S. event at The Forum on October 13. The event was later rescheduled for an unannounced date.

Storylines
The show will feature an unrevealed number of professional wrestling matches, with different wrestlers involved in pre-existing scripted feuds, plots and storylines. Wrestlers portray either heels (referred to as rudos in Mexico, those that portray the "bad guys") or faces (técnicos in Mexico, the "good guy" characters) as they follow a series of tension-building events, which culminate in wrestling matches.

References

Professional wrestling in Los Angeles
Lucha Libre AAA Worldwide shows